The Nanticoke Indian Association is a group of Nanticoke who have their headquarters in Millsboro, Delaware.  They were recognized as a Native American tribe by the state of Delaware in 1922.  The Nanticoke are one of few state-recognized Native American groups in Delaware.

In 2002 Kenneth S. "Red Deer" Clark Sr. (1930-2015), the head chief of the association, resigned in protest because of actions by other members.  He felt they were shortsighted and not beneficial to all members.  One of the main issues was over how large the annual pow-wow should be and how much association members should participate in preparations for the pow-wow.

Formation of the Incorporated Body

In 1875, the state of Delaware passed "An Act To Tax Colored Persons For The Support Of Their Schools". At this time, the Nanticokes were not allowed to form a school for members of their own community, and had to pay taxes for schools that their children did not attend. Because of this, members of the Nanticoke community began to form what would soon be called the Incorporated Body. "This was a non tribal group of thirty-one Indian descendants who had volunteered to fight for the common cause and to pool their funds to support separate schools for their children". On March 10, 1881, the Incorporated Body was recognized by the state of Delaware. Through this, the Nanticokes were legally considered a third racial group (in the state of Delaware) and were allowed to erect two schools for Nanticoke children aged seven through twenty one. This event would spark the official formation of the Nanticoke Indian Association in 1922.

References

Further reading
Waldman, Carl.  Encyclopedia of Native American Tribes. (New York: Checkmark Books, 2006) p. 183.

External links
http://www.nanticokeindians.org/

Nanticoke tribe
1922 establishments in Delaware
Organizations established in 1922
State-recognized tribes in the United States